Yves Van Der Straeten (born 18 January 1971) is a Belgian retired professional footballer who played as a goalkeeper.

He was called to the national team in October 2000, in a game against Latvia.

External links
Profile on Footballzz.co.uk
Profile on foradejogo

References

Belgian expatriate footballers
Belgian footballers
C.S. Marítimo players
Expatriate footballers in Portugal
People from Berlare
Primeira Liga players
1971 births
Living people
Association football goalkeepers
Footballers from East Flanders